WMLX ("Mix 103.3") is a commercial FM radio station licensed to St. Marys, Ohio, operating at 103.3 MHz. It airs an adult contemporary format. Its studios and offices are located on West Market Street in Lima, Ohio, and its transmitter is located just outside Buckland, Ohio.

The station began broadcasting in December 1997 with 10,000 songs in a row. Phil Austin was the first Program Director, who brought the station to life. The station garnered top ratings, becoming number one by Spring of 1999 in the Adult 25-54 demographic with its Hot AC mix of music and top rated on-air personalities. These included Phil Austin and Kathy Hague-Fisher (who moved on to national TV in December 2006).  Renee Scott is now PD of Mix 103.3, along with other CC Lima stations.

The station made a move to be completely without live announcers starting December 11, 2006 and has remained so since.

The "Mix" branding is also used by several other Clear Channel-owned stations in Ohio, including WMMX in Dayton and WDFM in Defiance.

Former local on-air personalities
Phil Austin, Kathy Hague, Renee Scott, Missy Simms, Randy Hughes, Jim E., Tony Day, and Joey Lane.

See also
Mix FM (disambiguation)
List of radio stations in Ohio

References

External links
MIX 103.3 website

Lima, Ohio
MLX
Mainstream adult contemporary radio stations in the United States
IHeartMedia radio stations
Radio stations established in 1997